Angraecum filicornu is a species of orchid.

filicornu